St Mark's is a Gaelic Athletic Association club based in Springfield, Tallaght in South Dublin, Ireland. St Marks won the 2005 Dublin Intermediate A Hurling Championship then went on in 2006 to win the Dublin Senior B Hurling Championship.
St Mark's hurlers were promoted to AHL3 in 2018.
St Mark's fielded teams at AFL4 in football and AHL3 Hurling in 2019.
The hurling team won AHL5 and made it to the Dublin Junior A championship final too in 2017.
They also got to the Intermediate Hurling championship Final in 2018, another promotion in AHL4 the same year.
The club also caters for Juvenile, Minor and Junior teams in Football, Hurling, Camogie and Ladies Football.

Honours
 Dublin Junior Football Championship': Winners 2021
 Dublin Junior 6 All County Football Championship: Winners 2021
 Dublin AHL5 Hurling League: Winners 2016
 Dublin Senior B Hurling Championship: Winners 2006
 Dublin Intermediate Football Championship: Winners 2002
 Dublin AFL Division 11S Winner 2016, 2009
 Dublin Intermediate Hurling Championship: Winners 1993, 2005
 Dublin Junior E Hurling Championship Winners 2012
 Dublin Junior F Hurling Championship Winners 2011
 Dublin U21 FL Div 1' Winners 1994

Notable players
 Michael Doyle, later a professional association football player in England
 David O'Callaghan (dual player)
 Declan Bolger (Dublin Midfielder)

References

External links
Saint Marks GAA
Dublin Club GAA
Dublin GAA

Gaelic games clubs in South Dublin (county)
Gaelic football clubs in South Dublin (county)
Hurling clubs in South Dublin (county)
Tallaght